Malatang is a common type of Chinese street food. It originated in Sichuan, China, but it differs mainly from the Sichuanese version in that the Sichuanese version is more similar to what in northern China would be described as hot pot.

Etymology
Malatang is named after its key ingredient, mala sauce, which is flavored with a combination of Sichuan pepper and dried chilli pepper. The word málà is composed of the Chinese characters for "numbing" (麻) and "spicy (hot)" (辣), referring to the feeling in the mouth after eating the sauce.

Origin
Malatang is said to originate from the Yangtze River near Sichuan. In ancient times, boating was a big industry and many people made a living by towing boats. Working under the damp and foggy weather made boat trackers feel very sick. And when they were hungry, they cooked herbs in a pot and put Sichuan pepper and ginger into the soup to eliminate dampness. Malatang was created, then vendors discovered the business opportunity, and spread it throughout China.

Unlike hot pot, which is made to order and shared only by diners at a table, malatang originates from street food cooked in a communal pot. Diners can quickly choose what they wish to eat, and either eat on the spot or take away.

Preparation

Skewers

Typically a table with a big and flat saucepan is set up on the street, with a large number of ingredients in skewers being cooked in a mildly spicy broth. Customers sit around the table pick up whatever they want to eat. Given the large number of ingredients available, normally not all ingredients are in the saucepan at the same time, and customers may suggest what is missing and should be added.

All skewers normally cost the same. In Beijing  they cost one RMB each. Customers keep the used wooden sticks by their plates, and when a customer finishes eating, the price to pay is determined by counting the number of empty sticks.

By weight

In the mid-2010s malatang shops became popular in North China, especially Beijing. In these shops the ingredients are usually displayed on shelves, and customers pick their desired ingredients into a bowl. Behind the counter the selected ingredients are cooked in a spicy broth, usually at very high temperature for 3–4 minutes. Before serving, malatang is typically further seasoned with much garlic, black pepper, Sichuan pepper, chili pepper, sesame paste, and crushed peanuts. The price is calculated based on the weight of the self-picked ingredients. In Beijing, half a kilogram usually costs between 15 and 20 RMB .

Common ingredients
Some of the common ingredients include:

 wosun (celtuce)
 beef (chunks)
 dumplings
 lettuce
 spinach
 other mixed greens
 lotus root
 mushrooms
 fresh and instant noodles
 pork liver
 pork lung
 potato
 quail eggs
 Spam
 Chinese yam
 sheep intestines
 numerous types of dried and frozen tofu
 nian gao rice cakes
 beef balls
 fish balls
 chicken balls
 sweet potato
 tripe

In English
"Malatang" has entered English as a loanword.

References

External links
 

Street food
Chinese cuisine
Spicy foods
Chinese soups
Culture in Chongqing